The Manikongo, or Mwene Kongo, was the title of the ruler of the Kingdom of Kongo, a kingdom that existed from the 14th to the 19th centuries and consisted of land in present-day Angola, Gabon, the Republic of the Congo and the Democratic Republic of the Congo. The manikongo's seat of power was Mbanza Kongo (also called São Salvador from 1570 to 1975), now the capital of Zaire Province in Angola. The manikongo appointed governors for the provinces of the Kingdom and received tribute from neighbouring subjects.

The term "manikongo" is derived from Portuguese , an alteration of the KiKongo term  (literally "lord of Kongo"). The term  is created by adding the personal prefix  to this stem, to mean "person of the kingdom".

Afonso did not entitle himself Manikongo, but rather  (king of Kongo). 

Subjects were require to prostrate themselves before the Manikongo, approaching him on all fours, and when time came for the Manikongo to eat or drink, an attendant would chime two iron rods, cueing them to lay face-down so that they could not see him do so.

See also 
 List of rulers of Kongo

References 

 
 
Kingdom of Kongo
Kongo people
Monarchy